The Gnome 7 Gamma was a French designed, seven-cylinder, air-cooled rotary aero engine. Powering several pre-World War I era aircraft types it produced 70 horsepower (52 kW) from its capacity of 12 litres (680 cubic inches).

A 14-cylinder variant was known as the Gnome 14 Gamma-Gamma.

Variants
Gnome 7 Gamma
Seven-cylinder, single-row rotary engine. 
Gnome 14 Gamma-Gamma 
14-cylinder, two-row rotary engine using Gamma cylinders. 140 hp (104 kW).

Applications
List from Lumsden

Gnome 7 Gamma

Blériot XXI
Bristol Biplane Type T
Bristol Prier-Dickson
Henry Farman Biplane
Grahame-White Passenger Biplane VIIc
Handley Page H.P.3
Morane-Borel seaplane
Nieuport Monoplane
Paulhan Biplane
Royal Aircraft Factory B.E.3
Royal Aircraft Factory B.E.4
Short School Biplane
Short S.32
Short S.36
Short S.38
Short S.45
Sopwith Three-Seater
Vickers No.6 Monoplane
Vickers No.8 Monoplane

Gnome 14 Gamma-Gamma
Royal Aircraft Factory B.E.7
Short S.41

Specifications (Gnome 7 Gamma)

See also

References

Notes

Bibliography

 Lumsden, Alec. British Piston Engines and their Aircraft. Marlborough, Wiltshire: Airlife Publishing, 2003. .

Air-cooled aircraft piston engines
1910s aircraft piston engines
Gamma
Rotary aircraft piston engines